Norwich High School for Girls is an independent day school for girls aged 3 to 18 in Norwich, England. The school was founded in 1875 by the Girls’ Public Day School Company (now the Girls' Day School Trust), which aimed to establish schools for girls of all classes by providing a high standard of academic, moral and religious education. The school is a member of the Girls’ Schools Association and the Headmasters’ and Headmistresses’ Conference. The school consistently has one of the best academic results in East Anglia.

Entry into the school is selective at 4+, 7+, 11+, 13+ and 16+.

History and location
Norwich High School for Girls was founded in 1875 as the first GPDST school outside London. Originally situated at the Assembly House, Norwich, the school moved to its present location Eaton Grove, 95 Newmarket Road in 1933. Eaton Grove is Grade II listed. The school occupies several buildings, all of which were originally private houses; Stafford House (preparatory school), Eaton Grove (senior school) and Lanchester House (sixth form).

Year naming
Norwich High School uses its own nomenclature for the year groups.

Stafford House
Nursery (ages 3–4)
Reception (ages 4–5)
Kindergarten (aged 5–6)
Lower I (ages 6–7)
Upper I (ages 7–8)
Lower II (ages 8–9)
Upper II (ages 9–10)
Lower III (ages 10–11)

Eaton Grove
Upper III (ages 11–12)
Lower IV (ages 12–13)
Upper IV (ages 13–14)
Lower V (ages 14–15)
Upper V (ages 15–16)

Lanchester House
Lower VI - Sixth Form (ages 16–17)
Upper VI - Sixth Form (ages 17–18)

School Life

In Upper III (Year 7) and below all pupils study a broad curriculum including Latin and two modern languages. Pupils are required to take at least nine General Certificate of Secondary Education (GCSE) and IGCSE subjects in Lower V (Year 10) and Upper V (Year 11). In the sixth form, pupils usually study four or five AS-Level subjects for one year and most continue with three subjects to A-Level. Many students take the Extended Project Qualification (EPQ). In total, there are 24 subjects offered at A-Level.  Academically, the school is one of the highest performing independent schools in East Anglia.

Facilities
The school's facilities include a sports hall, performing arts studio, main hall (including stage), junior school hall, rowing gym, outdoor theatre, lecture theatre, boardroom, 25-metre swimming pool, 13 acres of playing fields, fitness suite, 8 tennis courts and 1 astro turf.

Scholarships
Academic scholarships and means-tested bursaries are offered upon entry to Upper III and Lower VI. The scholarships offered in Upper III are music scholarships based on the performance of the candidate in an audition and academic scholarships on their performance in the transfer or entrance to the senior school examination, whereas the scholarships offered in Lower VI are based on the performance in an optional examination based on English, Mathematics, Science and a foreign language of the candidate's choice from French, German or Spanish.

Notable former pupils

Academia
 Prof Jane Shaw (born 1963) – Principal of Harris Manchester College, Oxford, Professor of the History of Religion, and Pro-Vice Chancellor at University of Oxford
 Joyce Lambert (1916–2005) – botanist
 Dr Jennifer Moyle - scientist 
 Dame Prof Shirley Pearce (born 1954) – former Vice-Chancellor of Loughborough University and former professor at University of East Anglia

Literature
 Pat Barr (writer) (1934-2018) - author 
 Raffaella Barker (born 1964) - author and journalist
 Nina Bawden (1925–2012) – novelist and writer of children's books
 Jane Hissey (born 1952) – illustrator and author
 Stella Tillyard (born 1957) - author

Music
 Diana Burrell (born 1948) – composer
 Jane Manning (1938–2021) – opera singer
 Elizabeth Watts (born 1979) - soprano

Media
 Becky Mantin (born 1980) – television presenter
 Anne Weale (born 1929) - novelist and reporter

Performing Arts
 Olivia Colman (born 1974) – actress
 Hannah Waterman (born 1975) – actress

Politics
 Dorothy Jewson (1884–1964) – Labour politician
 Alice Walpole (born 1963) - United Nations Assistant Secretary General

Sports
 Sophie Hemming (born 1980) - England rugby union player
 Emma Pooley (born 1982) – cyclist who won a silver medal at the 2008 Summer Olympics
 Victoria Williamson (born 1993) – track cyclist

World War One
 Edith Cavell (born 1865) – nurse, executed by Germans in 1915

Headteachers
Miss Ada Benson (1875) 
Miss Wills (from 1875) 
Miss A. M. Tapson (early 1880s)
Miss Lizzie Gadesden (1884 to 1907, previously head of Newton Abbot High School, died 1918)
Miss Gertrude Mary Wise JP (1907 to 1928, previously head of Shrewsbury High School, died January 1935)
Miss Elsie Pringle Jameson (1928 to 1946, born 1880, died 1958)
Miss Prunella Riviere Bodington (1946 to 1953, later head of South Hampstead High School, born 1907, died 1984)
Miss Dorothy Bartholomew (to December 1976, died September 2011)
Miss Rhoda H. M. Standeven (January 1976 to September 1985)
Mrs Valerie Bidwell (from September 1985 to July 2010)
Mr Jason Morrow (First Male Headteacher; September 2010 to 2015)
Mrs Kirsty von Malaisé (from September 2015 to August 2020)
Miss Alison Sefton (September 2020 to present)

Controversy
In July 2017, Robin Malton, who taught at the school in 2000–2016, was given an indefinite prohibition order by the National College for Teaching and Leadership (NCTL) for sending inappropriate messages to young vulnerable students.

In 2021 the school faced an industrial dispute over plans to withdraw from the Teacher’s Pension Scheme. National Education Union members within the Girls Day School Trust balloted for strike action after an alleged “fire and rehire” ultimatum being out to staff. The GDST eventually agreed to allow current staff to remain in the Teachers Pension Scheme.

References 
Notes

Bibliography
Bodington, Miss P. R., Norwich High school 1875–1950 (Norwich High School, 1950)
Brodie, Alan, Memories, Milestones and Miscellanies: 125 years of Norwich High School for Girls (Norwich High School for Girls, 2003)

External links 
School Website
ISI Inspection Reports

Educational institutions established in 1875
Schools in Norwich
Private schools in Norfolk
Girls' schools in Norfolk
Schools of the Girls' Day School Trust
Member schools of the Girls' Schools Association
1875 establishments in England